Pat C. Trusio (January 3, 1916 – November 19, 2001) is a former Democratic member of the Pennsylvania House of Representatives.

References

Democratic Party members of the Pennsylvania House of Representatives
2001 deaths
1916 births
20th-century American politicians